Tama may mean:

Languages
 Tama language, the language of the Sudanese Tama people
 Tama languages, a language family of northern Papua New Guinea

Music
 Tama Drums, a Japanese brand manufactured by Hoshino Gakki
 Tama (percussion), a type of talking drum from West Africa
 "Tama", a song by Mory Kanté

People
 Tama Hochbaum (born 1953), American artist and photographer
 Tama people, an ethnic group in Chad and Sudan
 La Tama, previously Ocute, a Native American people of the U.S. state of Georgia
 Tama, the ring name of professional wrestler Sam Fatu
 Tama, clan of junior Kazakh Jüz "horde", numbering ca. 70–115,000
 Tama people (Colombia), an indigenous group of Colombia

Places
 Tama, Iowa, United States
 Tama County, Iowa, United States
 Tama, Niger
 Tama, La Rioja, Argentina
 Tama, Musashi, an old district in Musashi Province, Japan
 Tama Area, the western portion of Tokyo Prefecture
 Tama Cemetery, the largest municipal cemetery in Japan
 Tama Hills, an expanse of hills stretching along the southwestern flank of Tokyo
 Tama New Town, a residential development in the Tama Hills
 Tama, Tokyo, a municipality classified as a city, in western Tokyo
 Nishitama, Tokyo, a district in Tokyo
 Tama River, a river in Japan
 Tama-ku, Kawasaki, a ward in Kawasaki, Kanagawa
 Tama River, a tributary of the Koshi River in Nepal
Tama, Podlaskie Voivodeship (north-east Poland)
Tama, Świętokrzyskie Voivodeship (south-central Poland)

Religion
 Tama, Shinto term for reverence for elders
 Tama (votive), a votive deposit or ex-voto used in the Eastern Orthodox Churches
 Tama-nui-te-rā, the personification of the Sun in Māori mythology

Fiction
 Tama, the reactivated form of the android Dark Washu in the manga No Need for Tenchi
 Tama-chan ("full name" Onsen Tamago), a pet turtle character in the manga Love Hina
 Tama (novel), by Winnifred Eaton
 TAMA (video game), a Sony PlayStation and Sega Saturn launch game only released in Japan
 Tama Sakai, a character from the anime and manga D-Frag
 The Children of Tama, a civilization encountered in the episode Darmok from the television series Star Trek: The Next Generation
 Tama (Tamamohime), a talking fox-like character in the video game World of Final Fantasy

Other uses
 Tama (cat), a cat who was a stationmaster of a Japanese railway station
 TAMA 300, a gravitational wave detector
 Tama Art University, a Japanese private art school
 Tama edwardsi, a genus of spiders
 Tama Toshi Monorail Line, in Tokyo, Japan
 Tama Electric Car Company, a car manufacturer which became Prince Motor Company
 Tama-chan, an Arctic seal living in the Tokyo area which became a national celebrity in 2002 
 1089 Tama, an asteroid
 Armenian draughts
 Japanese cruiser Tama, a Japanese light cruiser during World War II
 Thymoma-associated multiorgan autoimmunity
 A wooden spool for making kumihimo braids with a Marudai
 An abbreviation of the name of the virtual pet Tamagotchi by Bandai
 An abbreviation for National Outline Plan

See also 
 Tamas (disambiguation)
 w:ja:タマ
 w:ja:玉
 w:ja:多摩

Language and nationality disambiguation pages